Neofidonia is a genus of moths in the family Geometridae described by Warren in 1904.

Species
Neofidonia nigristigma Warren, 1904
Neofidonia signata Dognin, 1909

References

Boarmiini